Desulfitobacterium chlororespirans is a Gram-positive, anaerobic, spore-forming species of bacteria. Its type strain is Co23 (= ATCC 700175 = DSM 11544).  It grows by coupling the oxidation of lactate to the reductive dechlorination of 3-chloro-4-hydroxybenzoate.

References

Further reading

Loffler, Frank E., Robert A. Sanford, and James M. Tiedje. "Initial Characterization of a Reductive Dehalogenase from Desulfitobacterium chlororespirans Co23." Applied and Environmental Microbiology 62.10 (1996): 3809–3813.

External links 
LPSN

Type strain of Desulfitobacterium chlororespirans at BacDive -  the Bacterial Diversity Metadatabase

Peptococcaceae
Bacteria described in 2001